Alan David Hickinbotham AM (9 December 1925 – 25 May 2010) was an Australian businessman and Australian rules football player and coach.

Biography
Hickinbotham was born on 9 December 1925 in Geelong, Victoria. During 1944 and 1945 he served in the Royal Australian Air Force as a gunner.

In 1948 he graduated from the University of Adelaide with a Bachelor of Science and Diploma of Education. From 1949 to 1951 he taught science and mathematics at Geelong Grammar.

Hickinbotham founded the Hickinbotham Group of Companies in 1954, which became one of Australia's largest building companies, developing over 50 community estates in Adelaide. He was an influential member of the Housing Industry Association SA and worked to sponsor skilled migrants from Britain to settle in Adelaide. He also had an interest in wineries in South Australia.

He was appointed a Member of the Order of Australia for "services to housing and urban development" in 1998. A scholarship at St Columba College in Adelaide is named in honour.

Football
Before his business career, Hickinbotham played six matches as a key defender for Geelong Football Club. He later captain-coached South Adelaide Football Club and retained ties with the club until his death. In 2005 South Adelaide renamed their home ground Hickinbotham Oval, (formerly Noarlunga Oval), in his honour. He played four representative games for South Australia.

In the early 1970s, Hickinbotham was part of a committee that drove the development of Football Park, a dedicated Australian rules football ground for major matches in Adelaide.

Politics
He unsuccessfully stood as a Liberal Party candidate for the Division of Hawker in the 1969 Federal election.

Death
Hickinbotham died in May 2010 after a long illness, aged 84.

References

External links
The Family Way – Hickinbotham Group

1925 births
2010 deaths
Businesspeople from Adelaide
Australian rules footballers from Adelaide
Geelong Football Club players
South Adelaide Football Club players
South Adelaide Football Club coaches
Members of the Order of Australia
Australian businesspeople
Royal Australian Air Force personnel of World War II